Seán Garvey (1952 – 6 May 2022) was an Irish traditional singer from Cahersiveen. In 2006 he was the TG4 Traditional Singer of the Year, considered "the most prestigious traditional music award" in Ireland.

Albums
Ón dTalamh Amach (1998)
The Bonny Bunch of Roses (2003)

References

External links
 

1952 births
2022 deaths
20th-century Irish male singers
21st-century Irish male singers
Musicians from County Kerry
People from Cahersiveen
Sean-nós singers